ChessCube.com was an online chess community with over 1,400,000 registered members. ChessCube.com was founded in 2007 by Mark Levitt, and offered live play, chat, and ChessCube Cinema. In 2009, ChessCube hosted the world's first FIDE-rated online matches played in the South African Open 2009 where arbiters were present near the players' computers as supervisors. On January 31, 2020, ChessCube officially ceased operations.

History
Mark Levitt, founder of ChessCube, was involved in chess publishing in the early 1990s. From 1997 to 1998, Mark built the online Chess World for British Telecom's GamePlay.com, but GamePlay.com naturally dropped its board and card games in 1999 after it listed. Mark launched ChessCube as a market test in 2007 in South Africa, and ChessCube was offered internationally in January 2008. As of August 2009, ChessCube had over 650,000 registered users from over 200 countries. On 10 August 2009, ChessCube announced a US$1.25m VC funding from InVenFin.
ChessCube has secured $1.8m to date in venture capital. Investors include InVenFin, a subsidiary of Venfin Limited, Michael Leeman and Vinny Lingham. ChessCube shut down on 31 January 2020.

Users
ChessCube had over 1,000,000 registered users globally.

ChessCube's community was managed by moderators who were ChessCube players themselves. Moderators might mute players who were abusive. They could also, as similar to members, report users if it seemed like they were cheating. Various chat rooms were set up for various groups, mainly by country, but also by politics, and other discussions. A dedicated ChessCube forum also existed independently of the main site to discuss the site and other topics.

Memberships
In mid-2011, ChessCube switched to VIP memberships while still allowing people without memberships to play a limited number of games for free. If people win cubits however by betting and winning games, it is possible to continue to play on the site way past the original number of games. This can be seen with many members who have played hundreds of games but are not VIP members. VIP members gain VIP status by buying crowns, another form of currency like the cubit, and are able to play in hourly VIP-only locked tournaments. They are noted unlike other members by their username being in gold instead of the usual grey and they have a crown under their mini-profile. Grandmasters and other FIDE titled players, as similar to other sites, automatically gain premium memberships.

Features
The ChessCube live chess was developed in Adobe Flash.

ChessCube Play was ChessCube's live chess platform. Games can be rated or unrated, tournament or standard, and timed or untimed. Fast games are timed games less than 10 minutes. Slow games are games longer than 15 minutes. Games can be standard or Chess960, a variant where starting positions are shuffled. Registered users who are logged in can spectate live games. "Tournament or standard" refer to either playing solo live games or tournaments on the site where people pay cubits to enter. People have two different ratings, one as their "standard rating" and the other as their "tournament" rating. People who do well in these tournaments gain prizes, usually cubits, but occasionally crowns.

ChessCube Chat allows all registered players who are logged in to chat to one another, either in chat rooms, while playing chess games against one another or while spectating chess games.

ChessCube also allows all registered players to have a customizable profile, invite friends, follow friends, and earn cubits, which is like a currency for the chess site. Cubits can be used to buy items in the virtual store such as backgrounds, voices, chess piece colors, and chess piece styles. They can also be used to play games. "Crowns" are another form of currency, mostly for premium/VIP players but also for those who are strong enough to win tournaments where they are crowns as prizes. Crowns can be used to enter specific tournaments and to buy things at a much lower "level" easier and permanently.

ChessCube Cinema is an Adobe AIR application that can be downloaded to a user's desktop. It allows chess videos and lectures to be downloaded and viewed by the user. These videos allow a chessboard demonstrating the lecture to be viewed alongside the lecturer. The Foxy Openings series can be purchased to be viewed on ChessCube Cinema.Kb.

SA Open 2009
In July 2009, ChessCube sponsored the South African Open held at Wynberg Boys' High School. After negotiating with FIDE, the World Chess Federation, several matches were played online using ChessCube. These matches were FIDE-rated — a world first for chess. Participants in Melbourne, Australia, played against participants in Cape Town. Amon Simutowe won the SA Open 2009.

Awards
ChessCube was a semifinalist in the Adobe MAX 2008 Awards.
ChessCube won the 2008 WP Sports Award: Media Award – Electronic.

See also
List of Internet chess servers
Rules of chess

References

External links

Internet chess servers
Chess websites
Internet properties established in 2007
Internet properties disestablished in 2020